Neversong, formerly Once Upon a Coma, is a psychological adventure game developed by American indie studios Atmos Games and Serenity Forge. The game is a sequel to Thomas Brush's flash game Coma, and was initially aimed for release on Microsoft Windows and Nintendo Switch in September 2018, and for PlayStation 4 and Xbox One in early 2019. However, creator Thomas Brush pushed back both dates to 2019 so he could perfect the game to meet expectations after Pinstripe.

The game will follow Peet who wakes from a strange coma and discovers things aren't exactly as they were. Children have overrun his hometown and all adults have vanished.

Development
A campaign for the game was held through Kickstarter with a funding goal of $25,000. The project ended raising $85,000, tripling its original goal.

Reception

Upon release, Neversong received mixed reviews by users and critics. Although the game being centered around story and narrative, it was criticized for its lack of gameplay mechanics and short runtime. The full Neversong experience clocks in at around five hours.

Neversong received "mixed or average" reviews according to review aggregator Metacritic.

See also
Pinstripe

References

External links
 

Adventure games
Apple Arcade games
Crowdfunded video games
IOS games
Kickstarter-funded video games
Linux games
Indie video games
Nintendo Switch games
PlayStation 4 games
Video games developed in the United States
Windows games
Xbox One games
Single-player video games
Serenity Forge games